"Diamonds" is a song by Australian singer songwriter Morgan Evans, released on 8 November 2019 as the lead single from Evans' forthcoming third studio album. The week following its release, it was the most added song on Australian radio. The song has peaked at number 94 on The Australian ARIA charts.

The song won Most Performed Country Work at the APRA Music Awards of 2021.

Background
Evans said the song is a love song written for wife Kelsea Ballerini. Evans said "It's a fun love song, but deeper than that it celebrates that journey, from lost to found, you feel when you meet that person and everything changes, forever". Evans further said "I handpicked my dream band for the session and I can hear each of their personalities in the record. It just sounds really fresh to me, I'm really proud of that, I can't wait to start playing it live!".

Music video
The music video was released on 12 November 2019.

Track listing

Charts

Release history

References

2019 singles
Morgan Evans (singer) songs
Universal Music Australia singles
Songs written by Chris DeStefano
2019 songs
Songs written by E. Kidd Bogart
APRA Award winners